WAXC-LD is a Low-power television station in Alexander City, Alabama affiliated with the Retro Television Network. The station is branded as WAXC-TV 3 with the number 3 representing its channel position on Charter Spectrum. The channel produces Auburn Blitz, a program that covers sports at Auburn University. The station also produces telecast of local high school sports and Sportz Biltz, a show focusing on Alabama sports.

History
For many years, the station was co-owned with WETU-LD and carried the same programming including a UPN affiliation during the 1990s. After dropping UPN, WAXC became a Pax TV (later i and Ion) affiliate.

Sportz Blitz
Sportz Blitz is a weekly live interactive sports talk television show broadcast across central Alabama. The show originates from WAXC's studios and is simulcast on WKGA 97.5 FM radio in east central Alabama. The show is also carried by WOTM-LD in the Birmingham market, and WETU-LD in the Montgomery market.

The show focuses on Alabama high school and college sports, specifically Auburn University and the University of Alabama. Additional topics include major national professional sports stories and outdoors sports such as fishing and hunting. Differentiating the show from news broadcasts and other sports television shows, the hosts take live calls from the audience and discuss issues on the air in the same manner as sports radio shows.

History
Sportz Blitz began airing during football season in the Fall of 2006. The broadcast schedule was extended for Season 2 (2007-2008) to air year round.  In the Fall of 2007 a spin-off program began airing, Sportz Blitz Outdoors, featuring the same hosts and B.A.S.S. Elite Series professional fisherman Greg Vinson providing outdoor sports instruction for new show, Sportz Blitz Outdoors. On February 26, 2008 a new radio call-in show spin-off was created called "Sportz Blitz Overtime" which airs on WKGA 97.5 FM following the regular television broadcast.

References

External links
WAXC-TV 3 official website
Sportz Blitz Official Site

Low-power television stations in the United States
AXC-LD
Television channels and stations established in 1995
1995 establishments in Alabama